Go-Stop, also called Godori (after the winning move in the game) is a Korean fishing card game played with a Hwatu deck. The game can be called Matgo when only two players are playing. 

The game is derived from similar Japanese fishing games such as Hana-awase and Hachihachi, though the Japanese hanafuda game Koi-koi is in turn partially derived from Go-Stop.

Modern Korean-produced hwatu decks usually includes bonus cards specifically intended for play with Go-Stop, unlike Japanese hanafuda decks. Typically there are two or three players, although there is a variation where four players can play. The objective of this game is to score a minimum predetermined number of points, usually three or seven, and then call a "Go" or a "Stop", where the name of the game derives. When a "Go" is called, the game continues, and the number of points or amount of money is first increased, and then doubled, tripled, quadrupled and so on. A player calling "Go" risks another player scoring the minimum and winning all the points themselves. If a "Stop" is called, the game ends and the caller collects their winnings.

Setup 

In order to select a dealer, each player picks random cards from the deck and the person who chooses the earliest or latest month card becomes the dealer, depending on whether it is nighttime or daytime, with nighttime favoring the earliest month card, i.e. January, and the latest month card favored during daytime, i.e. December. (밤일낮장) Before the cards are dealt, the dealer shuffles the cards by holding the deck in the left hand with the cards face-down and pulling out random stacks of cards with the right hand to stack them on top. The dealer must repeat this process several times in order to shuffle the cards sufficiently. After shuffling, the dealer holds the deck out to the player to their left in order for them to cut the deck. If there are only two players, the opponent cuts the deck.

Deal 
Two players: The dealer places four cards face-up on the table then deals five cards to their opponent's hand and five cards to their hand. Then, the dealer places another four cards face-up on the table and deals another five cards to each player's hand, starting with the opponent.
Three players: The dealer places three cards face-up on the table then deals four cards to each player's hand, starting with the player to the right and continuing counterclockwise. Then, the dealer places another three cards face-up on the table and deals another three cards to each player's hand, again starting with the player on the right.

The remaining cards are placed face down on top of the cut portion of the deck in the center of the table to form a draw pile. Before the play begins, the players check for sets of two, three or four cards of the same month on the table. If there is a set, they pile it up on top of each other, usually leaving space on each of the top part of the cards.

Gameplay 
 Play begins with the dealer and continues counterclockwise.
 A turn begins with a player attempting to match one of the cards lying face-up on the table with a card of the same month in their hand. If there are two cards of the same month already on the table, the player may select one of them. If the player has no cards matching the cards on the table, the player discards a card to the table.
 The turn continues with the player flipping over the top card from the draw pile and looking for a card of the same month on the table.  If the player locates a matching card on the table, the player collects both cards along with the cards matched in step 2. Otherwise, the drawn card is added to the table.
 If the card drawn from the top of the draw pile in step 3 matches the two cards matched in step 2, the three cards remain on the table. This is known as ppeok.  The three cards remain until a player collects them using the fourth card of the same month.
 If a player draws a card which matches the card discarded in step 2, the player collects both cards as well as one junk card (pi) from each opponent's stock pile. This is known as chok.
 If a player plays a card in step 2 for which two matching cards are already on the table, and then draws the fourth matching card from the draw pile in step 3, the player collects all four cards as well as one junk card (pi) from each opponent's stock pile. This is known as ttadak.
 The object of the game is to create scoring combinations to accumulate points up to a score of either three (for three players) or seven (for two players), at which point a "Go" or a "Stop" must be called.
 A game that ends with neither a "Go" nor "Stop" call is called a Nagari game. The dealer and play order of the following game remain the same as with the Nagari game, and when the game ends, the loser owes double money to the winner.

Additional rules 
Any player who has a set of three cards of the same month in their hand can show them to the other players in what is referred to as "shaking" the cards.  For each time a player shakes within a single hand, final points are doubled in the event that that player wins the hand.
If a player has a set of three cards of the same month in their hand and the fourth card of that month is located on the table, the player may play all three cards in one turn and collect all four cards as well as one junk card (pi) from each player's stock pile. This is known as a poktan. Shaking the cards before playing a poktan is also an option. A player who has played a poktan may then choose to skip step 2 above in as many as two turns (i.e. the player's turn consists only of drawing one card from the draw pile).
Any player who has a set of four cards of the same month can show them to the other players and win the hand immediately.
If there is a set of three cards of the same month on the table, they are combined into one stack.  The player who collects the pile using the fourth card of that month will also collect one junk card (pi) from each player's stock pile.
If there is a set of four cards of the same month on the table, the cards are reshuffled and redealt by the same dealer.
If there is a bonus card on the table during initial deal, the dealer collects the bonus card and turns the top card of the draw pile face-up and places it on the table.
If a player is dealt a bonus card, they may add it to their stock pile at the beginning of any turn and draw a card from the draw pile to replace it in their hand.
If a player draws a bonus card from the draw pile during their regular turn, they will automatically collect it along with any other cards matched during that turn, except in the event of a ppeok, in which all four cards (i.e. the three cards involved in the ppeok plus the bonus card) must remain on the table.
Player can show down when player have the others' win-card. The card that when other player get, others win the game is called win-card. Next player ask "Will you receive show down?" in the direction of progress. If next player says "No", player lay down another player's win-card. If everyone says "Yes", the game will be Nagari game.

Point system 
There are several ways to collect points in Go-Stop.

 Bright cards: One way to accumulate points in Go-Stop is to collect three or more of the five Bright cards (gwang). In most Korean hwatu decks, these are identified with the Chinese character .
When three gwang other than that of the month of December (referred to as bi gwang, bi meaning “rain”) are collected, this is known as “Three Brights” (sam gwang) and is worth three points.
However, if the Three Brights include bi gwang, this is called “Wet Three Brights” (bi sam gwang), and is worth two points.
When four gwang are collected, this is called "Four Brights"(sa gwang) and is worth four points. It does not matter whether 'bi gwang' is included in "Four Brights" or not.
When all five gwang are collected, this is called “Five Brights” (o gwang) and is worth fifteen to fifty points depending on house rules.

 Ribbon cards:  Another way to accumulate points is through acquiring five or more of the nine Ribbon cards.  A set of any five Ribbon cards is worth one point, and each additional Ribbon card after five is worth one additional point.  For example, a set of six Ribbon cards is worth two points and a set of seven Ribbon cards is worth three points.
 Although there are ten cards with ribbons, the ribbon card for December is excluded.
 In addition to the points associated with five or more Ribbon cards, points may also be accumulated by collecting a set of three matched Ribbon cards.  There are three blue Ribbon cards, three red Ribbon cards with poetry, and three red Ribbon cards without poetry. Note the December Ribbon card, which is also red and without poetry, is excluded. Each of these combinations is worth three points.
 Moreover, the two methods of accumulating points via Ribbon cards are combined.  If a player collects six Ribbon cards, including all three red poetry Ribbons and all three blue Ribbons, the player can claim three points for hong dan, three points for cheong dan, and an additional two points for having six Ribbon cards, for a total of eight points.

 Animal cards: A third way to accumulate points is by collecting five or more of the nine Animal cards.  The scoring system of Animal cards is quite similar to that of Ribbon cards.  A set of any five Animal cards is worth one point, and each additional Animal card after five is worth an additional one point.  For example, a set of six Animal cards is worth two points, and a set of seven Animal cards is worth three points.
 The bright cards with animals (January and November) are excluded.
 Two of the Animal cards do not picture animals: May (bridge) and September (cup). These two cards may be counted instead as double junk cards.
 In addition to this, if among the Animal cards, a special set of three cards with birds is collected, made up of the Geese (in the August suit), the Cuckoo (April), and the Nightingale (February), this set is called godori and is worth five points. Although the December Animal card has a bird, it is not counted towards godori.
 Both methods of scoring are combined, as with the Ribbon cards. Thus, if a player collects six Animal cards, including godori, the player can claim five points for godori, and two additional points for having six Animal cards, for a total of seven points.

 Junk cards The fourth and most common way to accumulate points is by collecting junk cards.  Any set of ten junk cards is worth one point and each additional card after ten is worth an additional one point.
 The junk cards are those not counted as bright, ribbon, or animal cards. 
 In addition, there are special junk cards called Double Junks, which are counted as two junk cards.
 Ten of the twelve suits have two junk cards each; November (two junk cards and one double junk card) and December (one double junk card) are the exceptions.
 Also, the Animal cards without animals mentioned above (for the May and September suits) usually are counted as double junk cards.

Ending the game
When a player accumulates at least three (for three players) or seven (for two players) points, the player must decide if they will continue that hand by calling "Go" or end the hand by calling "Stop".  If a player says “Go" once, the player must increase their score by at least one point in order to be given another opportunity to call “Go” or “Stop.”  A player who calls “Go” once has one point added to their final score. With two “Go”s, two points are added.  With the third “Go,” the score is doubled.  After the third “Go” (in which the score is multiplied by two), the score is multiplied by the number one less than the number of times the winner has called “Go.”  However, before calling “Go,” the winner must consider whether another player may increase their score to at least three or seven points within the next turn.

When “Stop” is called, any non-winning players who have called "Go" will have their penalty (calculated from the winning player's total points) doubled. This is called go bak. If a non-winning player has no Bright cards when the winner has accumulated points by collecting Bright cards, the player without Bright cards will have their penalty doubled.   This is known as gwang bak. Further, if a non-winning player has fewer than six junk cards and the winner has accumulated points by collecting junk cards, the non-winning player will have their penalty doubled. This is known as pi bak. All of these are cumulative.

As an example, if a player accumulates seven or more points through only Ribbon cards and Animal cards, the player may then call "Go." If, however, before the first player is given another opportunity to call "Go" or "Stop" another player accumulates at least seven points through both Bright cards and junk cards and subsequently calls "Stop," the first player would be subject to go bak, gwang bak and pi bak. Thus, the player's penalty would be doubled three times, in other words, multiplied by eight.

Gambling 
The game is commonly used as a light form of gambling. However, any amount can be assigned to the point.

The game is played with great caution outside of the family household, if ever played, as the gambling aspect brings in distrust through cheating, including the hiding of cards and the introduction of foreign cards to improve a hand, as common examples.

See also 
 Tajja, a South Korean comic by Huh Young-man which has been adapted into films and television
 A version of Go-stop, where the loser is hit on the wrist, is played by the lead characters in Episode 12 of Her Private Life (Korean: 그녀의).
Godori was played in Episode 11 of Reply 1988.

References 

Hanafuda card games
Fishing card games
Korean card games